Alejandro Gómez Maganda (March 3, 1910 – September 14, 1984) was a Mexican politician and a former Governor of Mexican state of Guerrero from 1951 to 1954.

He was the President of the Chamber of Deputies in 1947.

References

Governors of Guerrero
1910 births
1984 deaths
Politicians from Guerrero
Presidents of the Chamber of Deputies (Mexico)
Mexican people of Filipino descent
Institutional Revolutionary Party politicians